Chongqing North Station South Square, previously known simply as Chongqingbei Railway Station, is an interchange station on Line 3 (straddle beam monorail), Line 10 (heavy rail subway) and the Loop line (heavy rail subway) of Chongqing Rail Transit.

Located in Chongqing's Yubei District, it serves the nearby Chongqing North railway station.

History

It opened with the first phase of Line 3 on September 29, 2011 as Chongqingbei Railway Station. On March 23, 2016, in anticipation of the opening of another metro station just north of the same railway station, its name was changed to reflect its location serving the south square of the railway station.

On December 28, 2017, Line 10 opened for passenger  operations, however the Line 10 section of this station opened on December 28, 2018, exactly one year later than the other stations in the Phase 1 of Line 10.

The Loop line section of the station also opened on December 28, 2018.

Together the three lines (Line 3, Line 10 and the Loop Line) share the same concourse for entrance/exit and transfer while the Loop Line has one other concourse that solely serves Loop Line passengers.

Station structure

Loop line platform
An island platform is used for Loop Line trains travelling in both directions.

Line 3 platforms
Platform Layout

There are two side platforms for Line 3 trains.

Line 10 platform
Platform Layout

An island platform is used for Line 10 trains travelling in both directions.

References

Yubei District
Railway stations in Chongqing
Railway stations in China opened in 2011
Chongqing Rail Transit stations